The 47th Parliament of Australia is an upcoming meeting of the Parliament of Australia. New members were elected in the May 2022 election and will assume office on 26 July 2022. There will be eight new senators (1 Independent, 1, Liberal, 1 National, 1 Country Liberal, 1 Jacqui Lambie Network, 1 Labor, 2 Greens) and 35 new representatives (1 National, 3 Greens, 3 Liberal National, 4 Liberal, 7 Independent, 17 Labor) at the start of its first session. When taking office, ages ranged from 30 to 67 placing them mostly in the generation X and millennial categories. Of this group  women make up 56 per cent.

New members of the Senate 
State senators elected at the 2022 election are scheduled to take office on 1 July 2022 for a six-year term. Senators from the Northern Territory and Australian Capital Territory took office on 21 May 2022 for a three-year term.

Took office during the 47th Parliament of Australia

New members of the House of Representatives

Elected 21 May 2022

Took office during the 47th Parliament of Australia

Notes

References

Parliament of Australia